Galeria Kazimierz is a large shopping center located in the Grzegórzki borough of Kraków. The name derives from the neighbouring district of Kazimierz.  Phase 1 opened in 2004. The mall has around 38,150 m2 of floor space, complete with a wide variety of eateries and large shops such as Zara, Puma, Quiksilver, H&M and Alma Market. In all there is more than 130 retail units present within the mall along with a ten screen cinema. In 2007 construction began on a 6-storey office space which is part of the shopping mall.

See also
 List of shopping malls in Poland

References

Buildings and structures in Kraków
Shopping malls in Poland
Shopping malls established in 2004